Skynner George Woodruffe (6 June 1814 – 4 February 1848) was an English first-class cricketer.

The son of George Woodruffe, he was born at Chiswick in June 1814. Woodruffe made two appearances in first-class cricket for the Marylebone Cricket Club, with both coming against Cambridge University at Cambridge in 1836 and 1837. He scored 6 runs in these two matches, with a highest score of 4 not out. He was commissioned into the Queen's Own Worcestershire Hussars as a lieutenant in June 1841. Woodruffe died in February 1848 at Farthinghoe Lodge in the Northamptonshire village of Farthinghoe.

References

External links

1814 births
1848 deaths
People from Chiswick
Worcestershire Yeomanry officers
English cricketers
Marylebone Cricket Club cricketers